Portugal–United States relations are bilateral relations between Portugal and the United States.

History 

Despite various attempts to set up colonies in Newfoundland and Labrador and Nova Scotia, the Kingdom of Portugal never held any long-lasting or significant colonies in North America due to the 1494 Treaty of Tordesillas, which stipulated that the Portuguese were only allowed to set up colonies in the Old World (aside from Brazil, which the treaty failed to account for), leaving the New World open to Spanish colonization. Despite the lack of colonies, a small amount of Portuguese individuals did settle in North America prior to the 19th century.

Unlike other European colonial powers such as France and Spain, Portugal did not intervene on behalf of the United States during the American Revolutionary War. This was because of the aforementioned lack of Portuguese colonies in North America and also because of the historic alliance between Portugal and Britain, dating back to the 14th century. Portugal remained neutral throughout the conflict, eventually joining the First League of Armed Neutrality, a league of European states organized by Catherine the Great of Russia to protect neutral shipping, which was often interrupted and seized by the Royal Navy during the war. While the Portuguese military did not participate in the war, some of the aforementioned Portuguese settlers in the Thirteen Colonies did fight, such as the “Virginia Giant” Peter Francisco, a soldier of the Continental Army who was born in the Azores.

In 1791, Portugal became the first neutral nation to establish diplomatic ties with the United States, leading to the arrival of an American legation headed by David Humphreys in Lisbon. Consular relations with the Portuguese island territories of Madeira and the Azores were established in 1790 and 1795 respectively. When the Portuguese court fled to Brazil during the Napoleonic Wars, the American legation followed the court to Rio de Janeiro in 1810 and returned with it to Lisbon in 1822.

The U.S. and Portugal fought together in the First Barbary War (1801-1805) against the Barbary corsairs in an effort to reduce piracy and disruption of trade on the Mediterranean Sea.

Increased Portuguese immigration to the United States began in the early nineteenth century. Approximately 70 percent of these immigrants came from the Azores, with the remainder mostly coming from Madeira and Cape Verde, with very few of them coming from the Portuguese mainland. Most of these Portuguese immigrants settled in New England and ended up working in the whaling industry. The involvement of Portuguese immigrants in the whaling trade also led Portuguese American communities to spring up in the San Francisco Bay Area in California and in Hawaii (see also Portuguese immigration to Hawaii). Some Portuguese immigrants settled in cities further inland, such as Springfield, Illinois. Today, there are over one million Americans of Portuguese descent. While prolific in some areas, Portuguese immigration was comparatively tiny when compared with the large number of German and Irish immigrants that came to the United States.

The Portuguese government favored the Union during the American Civil War, providing assistance to the Union Navy during the conflict. Due to settling primarily in New England, most Portuguese Americans were Union soldiers.

In 1911, the United States declared its support of the 5 October 1910 revolution that abolished the Portuguese Monarchy and replaced it with the First Portuguese Republic.

In 1917, both Portugal and the United States joined World War I on the side of the Allies. During World War II, Portugal remained neutral until 1944, when it allowed the United States to establish a military base in the Azores. Both countries remained on the same side during the Cold War, with both Portugal and the United States becoming founding members of the North Atlantic Treaty Organization (NATO) in 1949.

The harmonious relationship between Portugal and the United States was strained during the 1960s and 70s. Amid a wider global trend of decolonization, the Portuguese colonies of Angola, Mozambique, and Guinea-Bissau, all in Africa, began to demand independence from Portugal. The strain in relations was caused by the United States declaring their support for these independence movements, a move which greatly angered the Portuguese government. Following the Portuguese Colonial War, Angola, Mozambique, and Guinea-Bissau all gained independence. The revolution brought down the dictatorial Estado Novo regime that had ruled over Portugal since 1933, beginning the country's peaceful transition towards democracy and allowing Portuguese-U.S. relations to be repaired.

Since the Carnation Revolution and the end of the Cold War, Portugal and the United States have remained close allies, fighting together in the NATO intervention in Bosnia and Herzegovina, the NATO intervention in Kosovo, the Iraq War, and the War in Afghanistan.

Overview 

The defense relationship between the United States and Portugal is centered on the 1995 Agreement on Cooperation and Defense (ACD). For 50 years, Lajes Field in the Azores has played an important role in supporting U.S. military aircraft (its importance such that the US had a contingency plan in 1975 to stimulate Azores independence in the event of a Communist takeover of Portugal). Most recent missions are engaged in counter-terrorism and humanitarian efforts, including operations in Afghanistan and Iraq. Portugal also provides the United States access to Montijo Air Base and a number of ports.

Portugal defines itself as "Atlanticist" emphasizing its support for strong European ties with the United States, particularly on defense and security issues. The Government of Portugal has been a key ally in US, supporting efforts in Iraq, and hosting the Azores Summit that preceded military action.

The United States exported $1.47 billion worth of goods in 2006 and imported an estimated $3.04 billion. While total Portuguese trade has increased dramatically over the last 10 years, the U.S. percentage of Portugal's exports and imports has declined. The Government of Portugal is encouraging greater bilateral investment. US firms play some significant roles in the pharmaceutical, computer, and retail sectors in Portugal, particularly in Lisbon, but their involvement in the automotive sector has sharply declined in recent years.

Resident diplomatic missions
 Portugal has an embassy in Washington, D.C. and consulates-general in Boston, New York City, Newark, a consulate in New Bedford and a vice-consulate in Providence.
 United States has an embassy in Lisbon and a consulate in Ponta Delgada.

See also 
Foreign relations of Portugal 
Foreign relations of the United States
Portuguese Americans

References

Further reading
 Marcos, Daniel. "Between the Atlantic and the Empire: NATO as a framework for Portuguese–American relations in early Cold War (1949–1957)." Journal of Transatlantic Studies 12.3 (2014): 324–341.

External links
 History of Portugal - U.S. relations
 U.S. Embassy in Portugal

 
Bilateral relations of the United States
United States
1791 establishments in Portugal
1791 establishments in the United States